Ormsund Roklub is a rowing club from Oslo, Norway.

Established on 21 July 1883, it is based on Malmøya in the Oslofjord, outside Bekkelaget. Well-known members include the 1912 Olympic bronze winners Claus Høyer, Reidar Holter, Max Herseth, Frithjof Olstad and Olaf Bjørnstad, and the post-war rowers Alf Hansen, Frank Hansen, Lars Bjønness, Magnus Grepperud, Svein Thøgersen and Peter Wærness.

References

Sports teams in Norway
Sports clubs established in 1883
1883 establishments in Norway
Rowing in Norway
Sport in Oslo